Arneb Glacier or Hallett Glacier is a glacier  long and  wide, situated in a cliff-walled bay between Hallett Peninsula and Redcastle Ridge and flowing northwest into Edisto Inlet as a floating ice tongue.

See also
 List of glaciers in the Antarctic
 Glaciology

References 

Glaciers of Borchgrevink Coast